Nowa Aleksandria is the only studio album by Polish band Siekiera. It was released in 1986, through the record label Tonpress. The album marks a departure from the band's punk rock sound in favour of the coldwave and darkwave genres. Although formerly unpopular within the Polish punk rock music scene, the album has later established a cult following within the Polish new wave scene and is now considered a household name within the cold wave genre in Poland.

Track listing 

All songs written and composed by Tomasz Adamski.

Personnel 
 Siekiera

 Tomasz Adamski – vocal, guitar
 Dariusz Malinowski – vocals, bass guitar
 Paweł Młynarczyk – keyboards
 Zbigniew Musiński – drums

 Production

 Alek Januszewski – sleeve artwork (graphics)
 Włodzimierz Kowalczyk – engineering
 Tadeusz Czechak – engineering assistance

External links 
 
 

1986 debut albums
Siekiera albums